Evan Marley Khouri (born 21 January 2003) is an English footballer who plays as a midfielder for  side Grimsby Town.

Career
Having previously been at the academy of West Ham United, Khouri joined Grimsby Town on a two-year scholarship in summer 2019. He made his debut for the club as a second-half substitute in Grimsby's 1–1 draw against Morecambe in the EFL Cup on 5 September 2020, in which Grimsby lost 4–3 on penalties. He made his league debut for the club on 17 April 2021, starting in a 2–1 victory over Bolton Wanderers. He was offered a professional contract with Grimsby Town in April 2021. He made 8 appearances for Grimsby Town across the 2020–21 season.

Grimsby secured promotion with victory in the play-off final, though Khouri was not in the matchday squad at London Stadium.

On 22 June 2022, Grimsby announced Khouri has signed a new two-year contract of their 2022–23 EFL League Two campaign.

Style of play
Khouri plays primarily as a central midfielder, but can also play as a wide midfielder or as an attacking midfielder. He is left-footed.

Career statistics

Honours
Grimsby Town
National League play-off winners: 2022

References

External links

2003 births
Living people
English footballers
Association football midfielders
West Ham United F.C. players
Grimsby Town F.C. players
English Football League players
Black British sportsmen